Ezel (also Ecell and Ezell) is a census-designated place (CDP) in Morgan County, Kentucky, United States. It lies along U.S. Route 460, west of the city of West Liberty, the county seat of Morgan County.  Its elevation is 945 feet (288 m).  it has a small post office, with the ZIP code 41425.

Demographics

History
First incorporated in 1882, the town was given the name Ezel, for a rock in the Bible, by its first postmaster, Eli Pieratt, when the post office opened in 1875.  It is now home to Ezel Elementary School and the Blackwater Volunteer Fire Department.

References

Census-designated places in Morgan County, Kentucky
Census-designated places in Kentucky